Amparo Rubiales Torrejón (Madrid, 20 October 1945) is a Spanish politician who belongs to the political party PSOE and is ex-counsellor of the Junta de Andalucía. She holds a PhD in Laws, and is a lawyer and Senior Lecturer of Administrative Law at the University of Seville.

Professional trajectory and feminism  
In its professional trajectory, she belonged to the Communist Party until 1982, and was councilor in the council of Seville and vice-president of the Provincial Deputation of Seville (1979-1981).  Between 1982 and 1986 she was in the PSOE but she was also a member of the Parliament of Andalusia (1982-1986). In 1971, she married Manuel Ramón Alarcón, having two children with him: Ramón and Clara. The marriage broke up in 1981.

When she was a young woman, Rubiales was involved in a political activist work against Franco's dictatorship. After that, she started a political career which lasted thirty years and finished in 2004. In relation with her political affiliation, in 1975 she joined the PCE, but in 1982 she resigned and joined the PSOE. She has worked as a councilor, vice-president of the Council, vice-president of the Congress, senator and deputy, and she was the first female member of the Andalusian Government and the first woman working as a deputy of the central government. In April 2017, she is still a member of the Council of State and a feminist activist of PSOE. Its mission is to promote equality between men and women.

In 2015, the Minister of Economy and Knowledge proposed to the Governing Council to approve the nomination of the presidents of the Universities' Social Councils. That gave Amparo Rubiales Torrejón the opportunity to preside the organ of Pablo de Olavide University as the principal responsible of the Social Council. The following year, and still working in the Social Council, La Asociación de Mujeres Investigadoras y Tecnólogas awarded Rubiales for her efficient contribution to improve the position and visibility of women in science and technology.

Politics  
Amparo was the first female member working in the Andalusian Government as the councilor of Presidency in the first Andalusian Government (1982-1984). She was named to take part in the Spanish Senate on 22 June 1986, when she belonged the Socialist Parliamentary Group. She was in the organs of the Permanent Deputation, as a deputy (from 15 June 1986 to 20 November 1989) and four times as a spokesperson in committees: in the Committee of Autonomies, Organization and Territorial Administration (from 16 September 1986 to 2 September 1989), the Justice Committee (from 17 September 1986 to 2 September 1989), the Committee of the Government Presidency and the Interior (from 17 September 1986 to 30 September 1989) and in the monitoring committee of the Interterritorial Compensation Fund (from 17 September 1986 to 2 September 1989). In 1991, Rubiales came back to Seville as a councilor and a spokesperson of the Socialist Municipal Group. She was National deputy in 1993 and between 1996 and 2000, Civil governor of Seville and delegate of the Andalusian Government between 1993 and 1996 assuming the Deputy Secretary-General of the Socialist Parliamentary Group. Between 2000 and 2004, Amparo was the second vice-president of the Congress of Deputies. She was a member of the Advisory Council of Andalusia (2005-2008) and also an elective State Councilor from 2008 to 2012. In addition, she was a member of the World Interparliamentary Union and the president of the Parliamentary Friendship Group with Italy, Greece and Argentina. In July 2012 she was appointed president for the PSOE-A.

Works

Conferences  
'La mujer frente al derecho' took place in Seville on 8 February 1968.

'La conquista de los derechos de las mujeres' at Centro de la Información a la Mujer in San Roque on 6 March 2014.

'Del derecho al voto a la democracia paritaria 'as president of the Clara Campoamor forum at Casa de la Provincia, Seville, on 4 April 2006.

'Saber pactar': the possible coalitions at the Faculty of Law at the University of Sevilla on 4 February 2016.

References  

 Sevilla, Diario de. «"Mi gran aportación política es haber servido de espejo para otras mujeres"». Diario de Sevilla. Consultado el 3 de abril de 2017.
 20Minutos. «La Junta nombra a Amparo Rubiales presidenta del Consejo Social de la UPO - 20minutos.es». 20minutos.es - Últimas Noticias. Consultado el 6 de abril de 2017.
  «Amparo Rubiales, Pilar Aranda y Benito Zambrano, premiados por la Asociación de Mujeres Investigadoras y Tecnólogas | DUPO – Diario de la Universidad Pablo de Olavide de Sevilla». www.upo.es (en español de España). Consultado el 6 de abril de 2017.
  España, Senado de. «Ficha del Senador». www.senado.es. Consultado el 6 de abril de 2017.
 Carrillo-Linares, Alberto (1 de enero de 2008). Subversivos y malditos en la Universidad de Sevilla (1965-1977). Centro de Estudios Andaluces. . Consultado el 14 de abril de 2017.
  «Una conferencia de Amparo Rubiales, poesía y cuentacuentos, en el Día de la Mujer | SANRÓPOLIS». SANRÓPOLIS (en español de España). 4 de marzo de 2014. Consultado el 14 de abril de 2017.
  País, Ediciones El (5 de abril de 2006). «Amparo Rubiales rescata la figura de Clara Campoamor y su logro político». EL PAÍS. Consultado el 14 de abril de 2017.
  «Conferencia ‘Saber pactar: las coaliciones posibles’ | Dirección de Comunicación» . comunicacion.us.es. Consultado el 14 de abril de 2017.

External links 
 Amparo Rubiales Torrejón - Ficha en el Parlamento andaluz 
 Amparo Rubiales Torrejón - Ficha en el Senado 
 Amparo Rubiales Torrejón - Ficha en el Congreso 
 Cuenta de Twitter de Amparo Rubiales

Spanish Socialist Workers' Party politicians
1945 births
Living people
People from Madrid
Academic staff of the University of Seville
Spanish feminists
Spanish socialist feminists